Legend: Legacy of the Dragons is a fantasy role-playing video game, more specifically a MMORPG, created by the Russian developer IT Territory in 2006 and published by My.com. The English version of the game was released on November 6, 2007. In 2008 the game was localized for the German market by Mail.ru Games GmbH (formerly known as Astrum Online Entertainment), followed by Turkish, Polish, Spanish, French and Italian. In 2014 the game ceased to be published by Mail.ru Games GmbH in these languages and was transferred to My.com.

Today the audience exceeds 8 Million players worldwide. In Russia the game has won the prize for the best internet presence ("Premia Runeta") several times and has a cult status with the Russian gaming community.

The most notable difference in Legend: Legacy of the Dragons to most other games of this genre is the fight system which is animated and allows for great tactical depth.

Finance
The online browser game Legend: Legacy of the Dragons is playable free of charge and without any further software. The game does not require monthly fees. The revenue generated with this so-called "free-to-play" business model mostly result from shops within the game. These offer a vast variety of items and equipment to the player such as armour and weaponry, potions, scrolls and so on. The player can pay for these items with gold, the in-game currency, which is awarded to each player in small amounts for fights with monsters or the successful completion of quests. Additionally the players can use real money in order to by the diamond game currency which in turn may be exchanged in banks within the game for gold. The success of this business model is apparent in the "exceptionally high ARPU (average revenue per user), which exceeds market's average by far".

Story
Legend: Legacy of the Dragons is set in the fantasy realm of Faeo in which Humans and Magmars are locked in an eternal battle for supremacy. The races live on two different continents, Ogriy and Khair, in which most of the game play takes place. Apart from these continents there are also the island of Fay-Go and an Underwater World in the Balluar Ocean which separates the continents from one another. In the world of Legend: Legacy of the Dragons there are diverse landscapes such as moors, forests, plateaus and mountains, as well as small towns and cities. In addition there are several instances and battle fields in caves, grottoes and castles. The game's graphics are like paintings, grim at times and have been created "with an eye for detail".

The chronicles cover the whole history of the fantasy realm of Faeo from its mystic creation up to the "epoch of the dragons", in which we live today. They tell of an everlasting battle for the necessary equilibrium of good and evil on the one hand and that of order and uncontrollable chaos on the other. Even-handed ruler over the whole of Faeo is the goddess Sheara, mistress of the dragons and the two most powerful of these lizards - Striagorn and Erifarius - serve her a patrons of either race, the Humans and the Magmars. The dragons are locked in their struggle for supremacy which is overshadowed by the threat of chaos in the form of the Chaos Army. The only chance to save the world of Faeo is for the races to unite, put their quarrels aside and face the formidable foe side by side.

Gameplay
The player can take on quests (Assignments, Missions) and fight monsters in order to raise experience points which in turn will increase the player's level and award virtual currency or items. In the course of the game several more option will become available to the player, for example choosing a profession, acquiring a reputation with different organizations, getting a mount or a pet and learning the use of magic.

Mechanics
The player navigates their character from one location to the next in order to move through Faeo. These static locations are linked to one another and each act as a small instance on their own. By choosing the hunting-mode the player can switch to table-top-view of the location and look for resources to collect or monsters to fight. The fighting system itself is a dynamic 2D flash animation in a third person view.  Here the player can see the character facing the enemy and use different attack moves as well as potions, scrolls and other items.

In the course of the game, several different kinds of interaction are possible for the player. For example, several players may join together in a group or in a clan. The player can trade, enter into an instance or a battlefield or take part in an event. Additionally the in-game chat and forum enable the community to communicate with each other. It is recommended to the players to join in groups as some of the monsters would be far to powerful for a single player.

Fighting Styles
There are three different fighting styles within the game. Dodger, Bonecrusher and Heavyweight. They depend on the different properties of armour- and weapon sets. The player selects a fighting style by choosing armour and weapons of one of these styles. The dodger style raises the player's agility while fighting, allowing the player to dodge attacks. The Bonecrusher items will increase the characters ability to utilise double-handed weaponry thereby dealing more damage to the opponent. The Heavyweight is a defensive form of fighting style, allowing the player to endure a barrage of hits and last longer in a battle.

Races
The player decides on registering with the game which of the two races to join: The Humans governed by reason or the hot-blooded aggressive Magmars. Both races differ in their features. They live on two different continents which are similar in structure but not the same. The player's choice in race will determine their home continent. Nevertheless, it is possible to travel to the enemy territory and fight the opposing race there. The feature theoretically enables the players to enter into a PvP anywhere in Faeo.

Ranks
There are 15 ranks within the game from Novice to Lord. Every player newly registered automatically starts out as a Novice. The advancement of the ranks is based on the increase of Valour. This is always awarded in PvP battles but is increased in certain battlefields where huge armies of both races meet in the melee. The ranks are a crucial in order to gain access to mighty weapons and armour which have a large influence on the outcome of a battle.

Content

Professions
Upon reaching the third level, the player may choose to take on some of nine different professions in the game. These are grouped in three sections: Collection, Production and Free Professions. The player may select one of each category.

A collection profession will enable a user to "farm" resources to be used with a Production Profession or sell to other players. The Production class will give a player the ability to transform resources into valuable goods. Therefore, a lot of the players chose a logical combination of Collection and Production profession. Set aside from these there is a third class of profession called "Free Profession". These will offer additional features within the game.

Reputations
By killing a certain type of monster, collecting special kinds of resources or taking part in certain battles a player may gain a reputation with one of the game's NPC organisations. There are 16 different kinds of reputation in Legend: Legacy of the Dragons, among them Bringers of Evil, Brotherhood of Virtue, Gods, Relic Hunters and many more.

Upon reaching a certain amount of reputation with one of the organisations, the player will have access to special rewards and items, such as amulets, scrolls and rare artefacts, which may be purchased at the organisation's shop. Some of the reputations compete with one another so that an increase in one will lower the other.

Mounts
Since travelling from one location to the other is an important part of the game, there are more than 20 different mounts for the player to choose from: From Goats to Tigers, Panthers to Rhinos, Birds to Lizards and even fantasy animals. These mounts can be called by the player by using a special amulet. They differ in level and abilities. Mounts render support to the player in battle, reduce the time it takes to travel from one location to the next, and carry some of the weight of the player's equipment, letting the player carry more items at once. The amulets necessary to call a mount can be obtained via quests or in the shops within the game. Several of the mounts can further be upgraded which will give the mount additional abilities for example a deadly poisonous bite in battle.

Recurring Events
Recurring events are special incidents which are integral part of the game for example the appearance of special monsters or resources at a certain location. They are tied to a schedule which can be accessed within the game. These events are open to all players. If visited regularly they will advance the player's influence in the area of Faeo where they take place. At certain stages of influence described in the schedule of the events the player will be awarded special boni. Furthermore, a certain level of influence is necessary for the purchase of pets.

Pets
These little animals and other beings will be close to the player at all times. They support the player in battle by casting special effects during the fight. Pets can be trained in order to advance their abilities. As a player's character gains experience the pet will do so as well: 10% of the amount the character was awarded will be given to the pet which ultimately gain levels in this manner. Each level will increase the frequency of the pet's interventions in a battle.

Clans
A clan is a consortium of players similar to a guild in other games. Clan members can join in the completion of quests, organize fights or may just be interested in forming a group for social communicative reasons. Furthermore, a clan has a special clan chat channel in the game, enabling the players to talk amongst themselves. In addition a clan has a safety deposit box where the members can store money and items. A clan can level up just like a character. Once a clan reaches the second level, it may take part in the special in-game event "Siege on the castle" and fight for the command of the castle and its secrets.

Magic
Players may choose to become a battlemage once they have reached the 11th level, which is quite an advanced level in the game. Magic will open a whole new set of fight moves to the player to gain an advantage over other players. The user can choose one of six different classes of magic, three for each race: Air, Fire, Water, Earth, Shadow and Light. Each of the three classes attributed to one race corresponds to a fighting style. Using a Grimoire a player can learn the spells of their school to use in battle.

Events
In Legend: Legacy of the Dragons several Events are held frequently, most of them on a monthly basis. They carry the main story and advance its side threads, add closure to certain episodes and celebrate bank holidays. These events are either a single one or the consists of several parts which can go on for several days. All of them are announced ahead of time in the game news.

By taking part in an event each player has the opportunity to acquire rare items or increase their abilities, for example Valour. There are numerous types of event: Solving puzzles, answering riddles, collecting special item, fighting certain boss-monsters or taking part in certain actions in the game. The events can take the form of special quests, PvE- or PvP-Events, in-game-sales and many other settings.

Updates
The game's interface, content and features are updated on an irregular basis. These updates incorporate expansions of the game world as well as new quests, new options for the player's character and several other features.

References

External links
 Official web page of Legend: Legacy of the Dragons

2006 video games
Browser games
Massively multiplayer online role-playing games
Video games developed in Russia